Piz Bles is a mountain in the Oberhalbstein Alps, located on the border between Italy (Lombardy) and Switzerland (Graubünden). On its northwestern side lies the lake Lago di Lei.

References

External links
 Piz Bles on Hikr

Mountains of the Alps
Alpine three-thousanders
Mountains of Graubünden
Mountains of Lombardy
Italy–Switzerland border
International mountains of Europe
Mountains of Switzerland
Bregaglia